Kenneth King (born April 1, 1948) is an American post-modern dancer and choreographer who is best known for his experimentations with dance and multimedia. A second-generation Judson Dance Theatre choreographer, much of King's experimental dance repertoire combines different movements styles with dramatic material and technological advances, emphasizing the importance of the human body through expressionism and symbolism.

Early life 
King was born in Freeport, New York and became interested in theatre and the performing arts early in life after being cast as the lead in a musical production for his kindergarten class. As a child of the commonly referred to “TV Generation”, a period in American culture in which the television replaced the radio as the new household commodity, King became extremely fascinated with this new form of entertainment and was intrigued by theatrics behind popular television programs. While in high school, King aspired to be an actor, and during college, although a philosophy major at Antioch College in Ohio, he acted in summer stock productions for three consecutive years starting in 1959. King soon became an apprentice actor at Adelphi College, and it wasn't until after attending a lecture by legendary American dancer and choreographer, Ruth St. Denis, that he became inspired to dance. King began his transformation from theater into dance by incorporating dance with speaking and props. By the early 1960s he was studying the art full-time. King studied with Sylvia Fort, The New Dance Group, Ballet Arts, Paul Sanasardo, and he also attended The Martha Graham School, while studying ballet with Mia Slavenska. By 1966, he was working with renowned dancers Merce Cunningham and Carolyn Brown.

Choreography and Multimedia 
Much of King's choreographic style is based on the idea of dance being a total theatrical experience. King's work was both reflective and innovative in his time in that he developed choreography with generally non-technical based  movement, unique to the 1960s post-modern era, but with the newfound technological approach - incorporating film, machinery, characters, text, speech, lighting, and costumes. King emphasizes expressionism and symbolism through the use of the body, while experimenting with space and time, but eliminating the post-modern idea of point of view. King believed that a dance could still have content even without point of view, stress and emotion. His works are often considered to be very personal and an overall poetic experience.

King began performing his own choreography as early as 1964. His first work was titled cup/saucer/two dancers/radio, and featured him and Phoebe Neville. Cup/saucer/two dancers/radio incorporated these experimentations with multimedia and was heavily influenced by the subject matter of pop art. King went on to  present numerous works at a number of theaters including, The Bridge Theatre, Judson Memorial Church (in association with the Judson Dance Theater and the Judson group), the Gate Theatre, Clark Center for the Performing Arts, The New School, and Washington Square Galleries.

Collaborations
King collaborated with a number of artists throughout the 1960s and 1970s. Before his dance career took off, King worked with filmmakers Andy Warhol, Gregory Markopoulos and Jonas Mekas in the early 1960s. Some major works include m-o-o-n-b-r-a-i-n with SuperLecture (1966) and PRINT-OUT (1967). Both of these works incorporate film and projections with dance. In addition to his cup/saucer/two dancers/radio partner, Phoebe Neville, some of his colleagues included Meredith Monk, Gus Solomons Jr., Elizabeth Keen, Cliff Keuter, Steve Paxton, Laura Dean, Yvonne Rainer and Twyla Tharp.

Philosophy
King's experimental dance repertoire is varied, combining a broad range of performance styles, theoretical and dramatic material and technological resources. He believes that dance doesn't necessarily require the performance of traditional technique. In a 1978 interview conducted by John Howell for the Performing Arts Journal, Howell asked King why his then recent choreographies, RAdeoA.C.tiv(ID)ty, DANCE S(P)ELL, and The Telaxic Synapsulator, performed at the Brooklyn Academy of Music contained more technical dancing in comparison to some of his older pieces. King replied, “ … in the dance field there are all kinds of ways bodies make signals, or signs.” He states that this is one of the reasons why he is so fond of dance.

References

1948 births
Living people
American male dancers
People from Freeport, New York
American choreographers